Santa Rosa Lake State Park is a state park of New Mexico, located on the eastern plains.

The park features the large  Santa Rosa Reservoir that is home to various fish species including largemouth bass, catfish and even walleye.

Gallery

References

External links
 Santa Rosa Lake State Park

State parks of New Mexico
Parks in Guadalupe County, New Mexico
Santa Rosa, New Mexico